Milan Kalina (born 13 August 1956) is a Serbian former handball player who competed for Yugoslavia in the 1984 Summer Olympics.

Club career
After starting out at Partizan, Kalina played for Dinamo Pančevo and Crvena zvezda, before moving abroad. He spent five seasons with Barcelona (1985–1990) and won numerous trophies with the club, including the Cup Winners' Cup.

International career
At international level, Kalina represented Yugoslavia at the 1984 Summer Olympics in Los Angeles, winning the gold medal.

Honours
Barcelona
 Liga ASOBAL: 1985–86, 1987–88, 1988–89, 1989–90
 Copa del Rey: 1987–88, 1989–90
 Cup Winners' Cup: 1985–86

References

External links
 Olympic record
 

1956 births
Living people
Handball players from Belgrade
Serbian male handball players
Yugoslav male handball players
Olympic handball players of Yugoslavia
Olympic gold medalists for Yugoslavia
Handball players at the 1984 Summer Olympics
Olympic medalists in handball
Medalists at the 1984 Summer Olympics
RK Partizan players
RK Crvena zvezda players
FC Barcelona Handbol players
Liga ASOBAL players
Expatriate handball players
Yugoslav expatriate sportspeople in Spain